The 2003 season of the 3. divisjon, the fourth highest association football league for men in Norway.

22 games were played in 24 groups, with 3 points given for wins and 1 for draws. Twelve teams were promoted to the 2. divisjon through playoff.

Tables 

Group 1
Asker – lost playoff
Fossum
Fredrikstad 2
Fagerborg
Moss 2
Lisleby
Kjelsås 2
Røa
St. Hanshaugen
Greåker
Tistedalen – relegated
Hellerud – pulled team

Group 2
Sparta – won playoff
Lyn 2
KFUM
Østsiden
Sarpsborg
Skeid 2
Rakkestad
Kvik Halden 2
Korsvoll
Grüner
Selbak
Torp – relegated

Group 3
Drøbak/Frogn – won playoff
Trøgstad/Båstad
Grorud
Kolbotn
Mercantile 2
Nordstrand
Spydeberg
Follo 2
Askim
Oppegård
Bækkelaget
Oslo Øst 2 – relegated

Group 4
Groruddalen – lost playoff
Vålerenga 2
Sørumsand
Grei
Fjellhamar
Nittedal
Leirsund
Rælingen
Bjerke
Skjetten 2
Lørenskog 2 – relegated
Bøler – relegated

Group 5
Elverum – won playoff
Strømmen
Kongsvinger 2
Sander
Trysil
Høland
Grue
Funnefoss/Vormsund
Galterud
Focus
Kurland
Aurskog/Finstadbru – relegated

Group 6
Brumunddal – lost playoff
Lom
Ham-Kam 2
Fart
Ringsaker
Hamar
Ringebu/Fåvang
Furnes
Follebu
Vang
Stange – relegated
Sel/Otta – relegated

Group 7
Jevnaker – lost playoff
Raufoss 2
SAFK Fagernes
Hønefoss BK 2
Hønefoss SK
Vardal
Hadeland
Toten
Vind
Kolbu/KK
Nordre Land – relegated
Søndre Land – relegated

Group 8
Notodden – lost playoff
Strømsgodset 2
Åssiden
Birkebeineren
Mjøndalen
Åmot
Drafn
Solberg
Seljord
Ullern
Vestfossen – relegated
Skiold – relegated

Group 9
Eik-Tønsberg – lost playoff
Råde
Ivrig
Ørn-Horten 2
FK Tønsberg 2 – relegated
Stokke
Borre
Flint
Falk
Rygge
Tjølling – relegated
Teie – relegated

Group 10
FK Arendal – won playoff
Larvik Turn
Skotfoss
Langesund/Stathelle
Skarphedin
Brevik
Larvik Fotball 2
Fyresdal
Pors Grenland 2
Urædd
Drangedal
Skidar – relegated

Group 11
Donn – won playoff
Flekkerøy
Lyngdal
Vigør
Vindbjart
Start 2
Våg
Trauma
Søgne
Randesund
Flekkefjord – relegated
Giv Akt – relegated

Group 12
Buøy – lost playoff
Eiger
Egersund
Randaberg
Bjerkreim
Hundvåg
Sola
Hana
Vaulen
Varhaug
Vardeneset
Ulf-Sandnes – relegated

Group 13
Sandnes FK – won playoff
Åkra
Torvastad
Haugesund 2
Bryne 2
Kopervik
Nord
Frøyland
Figgjo
Staal Jørpeland
Vedavåg Karmøy – relegated
Haugar – relegated

Group 14
Stord/Moster – lost playoff
Varegg
Askøy
Trott
Follese
Vadmyra
Trio
Arna-Bjørnar
Bremnes
Halsnøy
Loddefjord – relegated
Trane – relegated

Group 15
Norheimsund – won playoff
Lyngbø
Gneist
Bergen Nord
Radøy/Manger
Os
Voss
Hald
Tertnes
Austevoll
Sandviken – relegated
Ny-Krohnborg – relegated

Group 16
Jotun – won playoff
Stryn
Tornado Måløy
Fjøra
Førde
Skavøypoll
Florø
Sogndal 2
Sandane
Høyang
Saga
Kaupanger – relegated

Group 17
Volda – won playoff
Sykkylven
Spjelkavik
Aalesund 2
Brattvåg
Hødd 2
Hareid
Bergsøy
Ørsta
Ha/No – relegated
Aksla – relegated
Stordal – relegated

Group 18
Træff – lost playoff
Surnadal
Bryn
Eide og Omegn
Sunndal
Gossen
Bud
Åndalsnes
Kristiansund (-> Kristiansund BK)
Molde 3 – relegated
Midsund – relegated
Kvass/Ulvungen – relegated

Group 19
Orkla – lost playoff
Tynset
Stjørdals-Blink
Nardo
Flå
Melhus
Strindheim 2
Buvik
Sokna
NTNUI
Røros
Meldal – relegated

Group 20
Kolstad – lost playoff
Ranheim
Namsos
Rørvik
Verdal
Beitstad
Rissa
Nidelv 2
Selbu
Vinne – relegated
Malvik
Vanvik – relegated

Group 21
Innstranden – lost playoff
Fauske/Sprint
Bodø/Glimt 2
Stålkameratene
Steigen
Mosjøen
Brønnøysund
Mo 2
Nordre Meløy
Saltdalkameratene
Sandnessjøen – relegated
Nesna – relegated

Group 22
Harstad – won playoff
Melbo – relegated
Grovfjord
Morild
Skånland
Medkila
Ballstad
Ballangen
Leknes
Bjerkvik
Stokmarknes – relegated
Lødingen – relegated

Group 23
Salangen – won playoff
Finnsnes
Tromsø 2
Senja
Lyngen/Karnes
Fløya
Tromsdalen 2
Ramfjord
Nordreisa
Ishavsbyen
Bardu – relegated
Brøstadbotn – relegated

Group 24
Båtsfjord – lost playoff
Porsanger
Alta 2
Kautokeino
Kirkenes
Rafsbotn
Polarstjernen
Tverrelvdalen
Nordlys – relegated
Neverfjord – relegated
Honningsvåg – relegated
Nordkinn – relegated

Playoffs

References
NIFS

Norwegian Third Division seasons
4
Norway
Norway